Jarugu Narasimha Moorthy (born 1964) is an Indian organic photochemist and the director of Indian Institute of Science Education and Research, Thiruvananthapuram.He was a Dr. Jag Mohan Garg Chair Professor at the Indian Institute of Technology, Kanpur. He is known for his studies on photoreactivity and organization of organic molecules. and is an elected fellow of the Royal Society of Chemistry and the Indian Academy of Sciences. The Council of Scientific and Industrial Research, the apex agency of the Government of India for scientific research, awarded him the Shanti Swarup Bhatnagar Prize for Science and Technology, one of the highest Indian science awards, in 2008, for his contributions to chemical sciences.

Biography 

J. N. Moorthy, Born on 1 July 1964 at B. Kothakota, a border town in Chittoor district of the south Indian state of Andhra Pradesh, graduated in chemistry from Bangalore University in 1985 and completed his master's degree from the same university in 1988. Subsequently, he joined the Indian Institute of Science from where he secured a Phd in 1994 and went to the US where he pursued his post-doctoral studies under the guidance of Jay Kochi of the University of Houston. In 1995, obtaining an Alexander von Humboldt fellowship, he moved to the laboratory of Waldemar Adam at the University of Würzburg where he stayed for over one year. His next move was to the University of Victoria in 1996 to work with Cornelia Bohne and he completed his post-doctoral studies there in 1998. He returned to India to join the Indian Institute of Technology, Kharagpur in June 1998 as an assistant professor but stayed there only for a few months and moved to the Indian Institute of Technology, Kanpur where he served as an associated professor from December 2003 before becoming a professor of the department of chemistry in 2008. After holding the Lalit M. Kapoor Chair Professorship during 2011–14, he serves as the Dr. Jag Mohan Garg Chair Professor at the institute. In between, he has had various stints abroad as a visiting professor at institutions such as University of Bremen (Alexander von Humboldt fellow 2004-05), Jacobs University Bremen (Royal Society of Chemistry grants 2007), University of Strasburg (2010) and Osaka University (2010).

Legacy 
Moorthy received the junior and senior research fellowships (1989–93) of the Council of Scientific and Industrial Research, offered in association with the University Grants Commission of India and his researches have been focused on the organization of organic molecules and their photoreactivity. He is known to have studied the solid-state photochemistry of o-alkylaromatic aldehydes and Norrish Type II photochemistry of disubstituted butyrophenones and he demonstrated that the product formation emanates at the triplet state and that the diastereomeric 1,4-biradicals of the precursors of the products likewise collapse with different rates. He has documented his researches in several peer-reviewed articles; ResearchGate and Google Scholar, two online repositories of scientific articles have listed 138 and 151 of them respectively. He sat in the editorial board of the International Journal of Photoenergy from 2012 to 2015 and has also been associated with the New Journal of Chemistry of the Royal Society of Chemistry as a member of its editorial board from 2011 to 2013.

Awards and honors 
Moorthy received the Young Chemist Award of the Chemical Research Society of India (CRSI) in 2003; CRSI would honor him again with the Bronze Medal in 2009.  In between, the Council of Scientific and Industrial Research awarded him the Shanti Swarup Bhatnagar Prize, one of the highest Indian science awards, in 2008. He was elected as a fellow by the Indian Academy of Sciences in 2010 and by the Royal Society of Chemistry in 2014. The Indian Science Congress Association selected him for the Millennium Plaque of Honor in 2016. He has held several research fellowships including the Alexander von Humboldt Fellowship (1995–96) and the Ramanna Fellowship (2007–10, International Centre of Trans-Disciplinary Studies (CIRET) fellowship (2008) and J. C. Bose National Fellowship of the Department of Science and Technology (2015).

See also 

 K. Venkatesan

References

External links 
 

Recipients of the Shanti Swarup Bhatnagar Award in Chemical Science
1964 births
Indian scientific authors
Scientists from Andhra Pradesh
Fellows of the Indian Academy of Sciences
20th-century Indian chemists
Living people
Indian Institute of Science alumni
Fellows of the Royal Society of Chemistry
People from Chittoor district
Telugu people
Bangalore University alumni
University of Houston alumni
University of Würzburg alumni
University of Victoria alumni
Academic staff of IIT Kharagpur
Academic staff of IIT Kanpur
Academic staff of the University of Bremen
Academic staff of the University of Strasbourg
Academic staff of Osaka University